Dutch orthography uses the Latin alphabet. The spelling system is issued by government decree and is compulsory for all government documentation and educational establishments.

Legal basis
In the Netherlands, the official spelling is regulated by the Spelling Act of 15 September 2005. This came into force on 22 February 2006, replacing the Act on the Spelling of the Dutch Language of 14 February 1947.

The Spelling Act gives the Committee of Ministers of the Dutch Language Union the authority to determine the spelling of Dutch by ministerial decision. In addition, the law requires that this spelling be followed "at the governmental bodies, at educational institutions funded from the public purse, as well as at the exams for which legal requirements have been established". In other cases, it is recommended, but it is not mandatory to follow the official spelling.

The Decree on the Spelling Regulations 2005 of 2006 contains the annexed spelling rules decided by the Committee of Ministers on 25 April 2005. This decree entered into force on August 1, 2006, replacing the Spelling Decree of June 19, 1996.

In Flanders, the same spelling rules are currently applied by the Decree of the Flemish Government Establishing the Rules of the Official Spelling and Grammar of the Dutch language of 30 June 2006.

Alphabet

The modern Dutch alphabet, used for the Dutch language, consists of the 26 letters of the ISO basic Latin alphabet. Depending on how  is used, six (or five) letters are vowels and 20 (or 21) letters are consonants. Also note that, in some aspects, the digraph  behaves as a single letter.  is the most frequently used letter in the Dutch alphabet, as it is in English.

Sound to spelling correspondences
Dutch uses the following letters and letter combinations. Note that for simplicity, dialectal variation and subphonemic distinctions are not always indicated. See Dutch phonology for more information.

The following list shows letters and combinations, along with their pronunciations, found in modern native or nativised vocabulary:

The following additional letters and pronunciations appear in non-native vocabulary or words using older, obsolete spellings (often conserved in proper names):

Loanwords

Greek letters  become , not , but  usually becomes  (except before a consonant, after  and word finally). -- in French loanwords are written with a single  (mayonaise) except when a schwa follows (stationnement).

Vowel length

Vowel length is always indicated but in different ways by using an intricate system of single and double letters.

Historical overview
Old Dutch possessed phonemic consonant length in addition to phonemic vowel length, with no correspondence between them. Thus, long vowels could appear in closed syllables, and short vowels could occur in open syllables. In the transition to early Middle Dutch, short vowels were lengthened when they stood in open syllables. Short vowels could now occur only in closed syllables. Consonants could still be long in pronunciation and acted to close the preceding syllable. Therefore, any short vowel that was followed by a long consonant remained short.

The spelling system used by early Middle Dutch scribes accounted for that by indicating the vowel length only when it was necessary (sometimes by writing a double vowel but also in other ways). As the length was implicit in open syllables, it was not indicated there, and only a single vowel was written. Long consonants were indicated usually by writing the consonant letter double, which meant that a short vowel was always followed by at least two consonant letters or by just one consonant at the end of a word.

Later in Middle Dutch, the distinction between short and long consonants started to disappear. That made it possible for short vowels to appear in open syllables once again. Because there was no longer a phonetic distinction between single and double consonants (they were both pronounced short now), Dutch writers started to use double consonants to indicate that the preceding vowel was short even when the consonant had not been long in the past. That eventually led to the modern Dutch spelling system.

Checked and free vowels
Modern Dutch spelling still retains many of the details of the late Middle Dutch system. The distinction between checked and free vowels is important in Dutch spelling. A checked vowel is one that is followed by a consonant in the same syllable (the syllable is closed) while a free vowel ends the syllable (the syllable is open). This distinction can apply to pronunciation or spelling independently, but a syllable that is checked in pronunciation will always be checked in spelling as well (except in some unassimilated loanwords).

 Checked in neither: la-ten  ("to leave", "to let")
 Checked in spelling only: lat-ten  ("laths")
 Checked in both: lat  ("lath"), lat-je  ("little lath")

A single vowel that is checked in neither is always long/tense. A vowel that is checked in both is always short/lax. The following table shows the pronunciation of the same three-letter sequence in different situations, with hyphens indicating the syllable divisions in the written form, and the IPA period to indicate them in the spoken form:

Free  is fairly rare and is mostly confined to loanwords and names. As tense  is rare except before , free  is likewise rare except before .

The same rule applies to word-final vowels, which are always long because they are not followed by any consonant (but see below on ). Short vowels, not followed by any consonant, do not normally exist in Dutch, and there is no normal way to indicate them in the spelling.

Double vowels and consonants
When a vowel is short/lax but is free in pronunciation, the spelling is made checked by writing the following consonant doubled, so that the vowel is kept short according to the default rules. That has no effect on pronunciation, as modern Dutch does not have long consonants:
 ram-men  ("rams, to ram")
 tel-len  ("to count")
 tin-nen  ("made of tin")
 kop-pen  ("cups, heads, to head [a ball]")
 luk-ken  ("to succeed")

When a vowel is long/tense but still checked in pronunciation, it is necessarily checked in spelling as well. A change is thus needed to indicate the length, which is done by writing the vowel doubled. Doubled  does not occur.
 raam  ("window"), raam-de  ("estimated")
 teel  ("cultivate"), teel-de  ("cultivated")
 koop  ("buy, sale"), koop-sel  ("something bought")
 Luuk  (a name)

A single  indicates short and long e but is also used to indicate the neutral schwa sound  in unstressed syllables. Because the schwa is always short,  is never followed by a double consonant when it represents .
 ap-pe-len  ("apples")
 ge-ko-men  ("(has) come")
 kin-de-ren  ("children")

That means that a word-final single  will always represent a schwa.
 jee  (expression of woe), je  ("you")
 mee  ("along, with"), me  ("me")
   ("contraction of the womb"), we  ("we")

Because the position of the stress in a polysyllabic word is not indicated in the spelling, that can lead to ambiguity.

Morphological alternations
The length of a vowel generally does not change in the pronunciation of different forms of a word. However, in different forms of a word, a syllable may alternate between checked and free depending on the syllable that follows. The spelling rules nonetheless follow the simplest representation, writing double letters only when necessary. Consequently, some forms of the same word may be written with single letters while others are written with double letters. That commonly occurs between the singular and plural of a noun or between the infinitive and the conjugated forms of verbs. Examples of alternations are shown below. Note that there are no examples with  because free  does not occur in native words:

There are some irregular nouns that change their vowel from short/lax in the singular to long/tense in the plural. Their spelling does not alternate between single and double letters. However, the sound  becomes  in the plural in such nouns, not  That is reflected in the spelling.
 dag  ("day"), da-gen  ("days")
 weg  ("road, way"), we-gen  ("roads, ways")
 schip  ("ship"), sche-pen  ("ships")
 lot  ("lottery ticket"), lo-ten  ("lottery tickets")

Exceptions
As a rule, the simplest representation is always chosen. A double vowel is never written in an open syllable, and a double consonant is never written at the end of a word or when next to another consonant. A double vowel is rarely followed by a double consonant, as it could be simplified by writing them both single.

The past tense of verbs may have a double vowel, followed by a double consonant, to distinguish those forms from the present tense.
 ha-ten ("hate"), haat-ten ("hated"), both 
 ra-den ("guess"), raad-den ("guessed"), both 

Compounds should be read as if each word were spelled separately, and they may therefore appear to violate the normal rules. That may sometimes cause confusion if the word is not known to be a compound.
 dag-ar-bei-der  or more fluently  ("day labourer"), a compound of dag ("day") + arbeider ("labourer") so it is not divided as *da-gar-bei-der . If it were not a compound, it would be written *dag-gar-bei-der to keep the first "a" short.
 een-en-twin-tig  ("twenty-one"), a compound of een ("one") + en ("and") + twintig ("twenty"). If it were not a compound, it would be written *e-nen-twin-tig to avoid having a double vowel at the end of a syllable.
 mee-doen  ("to participate"), a compound of mee ("along (with)") + doen ("do"). If it were not a compound, it would be written *me-doen to avoid having a double vowel at the end of a syllable. The word mee itself has a double vowel because of the exception with final -, as noted above.

==Final devoicing and the t kofschip rule==

Final devoicing is not indicated in Dutch spelling; words are usually spelled according to the historically original consonant. Therefore, a word may be written with a letter for a voiced consonant at the end of a word but still be pronounced with a voiceless consonant:

 heb  "(I) have" but hebben  "to have"
 paard  "horse" but paarden  "horses"
 leg  "(I) lay" but leggen  "to lay"

Weak verbs form their past tense and past participle by addition of a dental,  or  depending on the voicing of the preceding consonant(s) (see Assimilation (linguistics)). However, because final consonants are always devoiced, there is no difference in pronunciation between these in the participle. Nonetheless, in accordance with the above rules, the orthography operates as if the consonant were still voiced. It is written in the past participle the same as the other past tense forms in which it is not word-final. To help memorise when to write  and when , Dutch students are taught the rule "'t kofschip is met thee beladen" ("the merchant ship is loaded with tea"). If the verb stem in the infinitive ends with one of the consonants of "'t kofschip" (-t, -k, -f, -s, -ch or -p), the past tense dental is a -t-; otherwise, it is a -d-. However, the rule also applies to loanwords ending in -c, -q or -x, as these are also voiceless.

 and 

 They are permitted only at the start of a syllable in native words, not at the end.
 For historic reasons, they are never preceded by a short/lax vowel and so never occur doubled.
 When the sounds  and  occur at the end of a syllable, they are written  and  respectively.

Then, therefore, final devoicing is reflected in the spelling:

 blijven  ("to stay") → blijf  "(I) stay"
 huizen  "houses" → huis  "house"

The pronunciation remains voiced even if the spelling shows a voiceless consonant. This is most common in the past tense forms of weak verbs:

 leven  ("to live") → leefde  "(I) lived"
 blozen  ("to blush") → bloosde  "(I) blushed"

Compare this to verbs in which the final consonant is underlyingly voiceless. Here, the dental assimilation rule calls for the ending -te, which gives away the voicelessness of the previous sound even if the spelling of that sound itself does not:

 blaffen  ("to bark") → blafte  "(I) barked"
 ruisen  ("to rustle, to hiss") → ruist'e  "(I) rustled"

Some modern loanwords and new coinages do not follow these rules. However, these words tend to not follow the other spelling rules as well: buzzen ("to page (call on a pager)") → buzz ("(I) page"), buzzde ("(I) paged").

Diacritics
Dutch uses the acute accent to mark stress and the diaeresis (trema) to disambiguate diphthongs/triphthongs. Occasionally, other diacritics are used in loanwords. Accents are not necessarily placed on capital letters (for example, the word Eén at the beginning of a sentence) unless the whole word is written in capitals.

Acute accent

Acute accents may be used to emphasise a word in a phrase, on the vowel in the stressed syllable. If the vowel is written as a digraph, an acute accent is put on both parts of the digraph. Although that rule includes ij, the acute accent on the j is frequently omitted in typing (resulting in íj instead of íj́), as putting an acute accent on a j is still problematic in most word processing software. If the vowel is written as more than two letters, the accent is put on the first two vowel letters – except when the first letter is a capital one. According to the Taalunie, accents on capital letters are used only in all caps and in loanwords. So, it is correct to write één, Eén, and ÉÉN, but not to write Één. The Genootschap Onze Taal states that accents can be put on capital letters whenever the need arises, but makes an exception for Eén.

Stress on a short vowel, written with only one letter, is occasionally marked with a grave accent: Kàn jij dat? (equivalent to the example below), wèl. However, it is technically incorrect to do so.

Additionally, the acute accent may also be used to mark different meanings of various words, including een/één (a(n)/one), voor/vóór (for/before), vóórkomen/voorkómen (to occur/to prevent), and vérstrekkend/verstrékkend (far-reaching/issuing), as shown in the examples below.

Examples

Diaeresis
A diaeresis is used to mark a hiatus, if the combination of vowel letters may be either mistaken for a digraph or interpreted in more than one way: "geïnd" (collected), "geüpload" (uploaded), "egoïstisch" (egoistic), "sympathieën" (sympathies, preferences), coördinaat (coordinate), "reëel" (realistic), "zeeën" (seas). On a line break that separates the vowels but keeps parts of a digraph together, the diaeresis becomes redundant and so is not written: ego-/istisch, sympathie-/en, re-/eel, zee-/en. The rule can be extended to names, such as "Michaëlla", e.g. Michaëlla Krajicek. The diaeresis is only used in derivational suffixes; compounds are written with a hyphen, for example "auto-ongeluk" (car accident).

Diacritics in loanwords
The grave accent is used in some French loanwords and generally when pronunciation would be wrong without it, such as après-ski, barrière (barrier), bèta, caissière (female cashier), carrière (career) and hè? ("What?"), blèren (to yell). Officially, appel is always written without an accent, but sometimes an accent is used to distinguish between appel ("apple") and appèl ("appeal", "roll call", and others).

Besides being used to mark stress, acute accents are also used in many loanwords (mainly from French) such as logé (overnight guest), coupé (train compartment), oké (okay) and café.

Similarly, a circumflex accent is also used in some French loanwords, including enquête (survey), and fêteren (to treat). For gênant (embarrassing) it is indecisive, some sources state it should be without the accent since it makes no difference to the pronunciation, others prefer to use the accent. The circumflex accent is also used in West Frisian Dutch and so in general Dutch as well if there is no translation. Skûtsjesilen is the most common example, where silen is West Frisian Dutch for zeilen (to sail) and a skûtsje is a specific type of sailboat.

Apostrophe
As in English, an apostrophe is used to mark omission of a part of word or several words:

Contrary to the city of Den Haag, ’s-Hertogenbosch has decided to retain the more formal orthography of its name for common communication like road signing.

Except in all caps, the letter immediately following a word-initial apostrophe is not capitalised. If necessary, the second word is capitalised instead:
’s Avonds is zij nooit thuis. (In the evening, she is never at home.).

See also
 Dutch braille
 History of Dutch orthography
 IJ (digraph)
 Matthijs Siegenbeek
 Nederlandse Taalunie
 Grand Dictation of the Dutch Language

Notes and references

Bibliography
 Vincent van Heuven, Spelling en Lezen.  Hoe Tragisch Zijn de Werkwoordsvormen?, Assen: Van Gorcum, 1978.
 Rob Naborn, De Spelling-Siegenbeek (1804), Doctoraalscriptie, Vrije Universiteit, Amsterdam, 1985.
 Marijke van der Wal, Geschiedenis van het Nederlands, Utrecht: Het Spectrum, 1994.
 Nicoline van der Sijs, Taal als mensenwerk. Het ontstaan van het ABN, Den Haag: Sdu Uitgevers, 2004.
 Anneke Nunn, Dutch Orthography: A Systematic Investigation of the Spelling of Dutch Words, Katholieke Universiteit Nijmegen, Doctoral dissertation, 1998.

External links 
 De grondbeginselen der Nederlandsche spelling. Ontwerp der spelling voor het aanstaande Nederlandsch Woordenboek (1863) by L.A. te Winkel
 De grondbeginselen der Nederlandsche spelling. Regeling der spelling voor het woordenboek der Nederlandsche taal (1873) by L.A. te Winkel and M. de Vries
 Woordenlijst Nederlandse taal online (Word list of the Dutch language, 2015) by the Dutch Language Union (Taalunie)
 De witte spelling (2006) by the Society "Onze Taal"
 "New Spelling" of the Dutch language

Dutch language
Indo-European Latin-script orthographies